Kansas City Southern may refer to:
 Kansas City Southern Railway
 Kansas City Southern (company), the parent company of the railway
 "Kansas City Southern", a song by Dillard & Clark from the album Through the Morning, Through the Night